Akumfi Ameyaw Munufie was a lawyer, politician and a ghanaian diplomat. He was the minister of Social Development and later minister of Rural Development and Social Welfare in the second republic, he was Ghana's ambassador to Côte d'Ivoire in the fourth republic.

Early life and education
Munufie was born on 2 December 1929 at Techiman in the Brong Ahafo Region. He began his education at Wenchi Methodist School and continued at Livingstone College in Akropong, Akwapim he later proceeded to Holborn College of Law, London.

Career
His career begun as a teacher at the Techiman Methodist School he later entered into private law practice 1963 to 1969.

Politics
In 1969 he was elected as a member of parliament representing Techiman. That same year he was appointed minister of Social Development. He served in this capacity until 1971. In 1971, he was appointed minister of Youth, Rural Development and Social Welfare. He remained in this position until January 1972 when the Busia government was overthrown by the SMC. In 1992 he joined the National Democratic Congress and became co-chairman of the party with Alhaji Issifu Ali. He was later appointed as Ghana's ambassador to Côte d'Ivoire.

Death
He died on 17 February 2006.

See also
 Busia government
 MPs elected in the Ghanaian parliamentary election, 1969

References

1929 births
2006 deaths
Government ministers of Ghana
People from Brong-Ahafo Region
Ghanaian MPs 1969–1972
20th-century Ghanaian politicians
20th-century Ghanaian lawyers
National Democratic Congress (Ghana) politicians
Ambassadors of Ghana to Ivory Coast
Progress Party (Ghana) politicians